Hilda Maria Carlén (born 13 August 1991) is a Swedish football goalkeeper who played for Linköpings FC of the Damallsvenskan. She has represented Sweden at senior international level.

Club career
After signing for Malmö for the 2009 season, Carlén was understudy to Caroline Jönsson, then Þóra Björg Helgadóttir. She also spent the 2010 season on loan at Damallsvenskan rivals Linköpings FC, where she was back-up to established goalkeeper Sofia Lundgren. Carlén played in Linköpings' 2010–11 UEFA Women's Champions League win over ŽNK Krka, but did not play in the league and was instead sent to get match practice playing for Stattena IF.

Carlén joined Hammarby IF of the Elitettan for the 2013 season, in her quest for first team football. She was back in the Damallsvenskan with Piteå IF for 2014 and made her top level debut on 13 April 2014 in Piteå's 1–0 win over Linköpings.

She made 20 league appearances in her first season with Piteå and was nominated for the "Årets målvakt" award won by Hedvig Lindahl.

International career
Carlén was Sweden's goalkeeper at the 2009 UEFA Women's Under-19 Championship in Belarus and the 2010 FIFA U-20 Women's World Cup in Germany. She made her senior international debut against Finland on 12 February 2015. That month she was also selected in the squad for the 2015 Algarve Cup.

In May 2015, Carlén and Piteå team-mate Emilia Appelqvist were both confirmed in Sweden's squad for the 2015 FIFA Women's World Cup in Canada.

Personal life
Hilda's father is Per Carlén, a team handball coach and former player. Her mother Margareta and brother Oscar also represented Sweden at handball.

Honours

Club
 LdB FC Malmö
 Damallsvenskan: 2011
 Svenska Supercupen: 2011, 2012

 Linköpings FC
 Svenska Supercupen: 2010

International
 Summer Olympic Games: Silver Medal, 2016

References

External links

 
 
 
  
  
 
 
 
 

Swedish women's footballers
1991 births
Living people
Sweden women's international footballers
Damallsvenskan players
Hammarby Fotboll (women) players
FC Rosengård players
Linköpings FC players
Piteå IF (women) players
2015 FIFA Women's World Cup players
Footballers at the 2016 Summer Olympics
People from Ystad Municipality
Olympic footballers of Sweden
Medalists at the 2016 Summer Olympics
Olympic silver medalists for Sweden
Olympic medalists in football
Women's association football goalkeepers
Sportspeople from Skåne County
UEFA Women's Euro 2017 players